The Changbai–Hyesan International Bridge is a bridge over the Yalu River, connecting Changbai Korean Autonomous County of Changbai City, Jilin Province, China, with Hyesan City of Ryanggang Province, North Korea. Since 1992, one-day, five-day and ten-day tours have been conducted between China and North Korea.

See also
 Sino–Korean Friendship Bridge and New Yalu River Bridge (Dandong City)
 Ji'an Yalu River Border Railway Bridge
 Linjiang Yalu River Bridge
 Tumen Border Bridge (Tumen City)
 Tumen River Bridge (Hunchun City)

References

International bridges
Bridges in North Korea
Buildings and structures in Ryanggang Province
Bridges in China
Buildings and structures in Jilin
Transport in Jilin
China–North Korea border crossings
Bridges completed in 1985